Cleveland School of the Arts (CSA) is a public high school serving grades 9 - 12. It is located in University Circle, the cultural center of Cleveland, Ohio surrounded by an extensive artistic community.  It is the only fully infused academic and arts High School of the Cleveland Metropolitan School District. The school opened in 1981. Cleveland School of the Arts consists of artistic classes in Dance, Interdisciplinary Arts, Literary Arts, Music (Band, Orchestra, Vocal) Theater, and the Visual Arts (Drawing, Photography).

Relocation to new site
The new 21st century arts facility opened in August, 2015 for the 2015–2016 school year. The new Cleveland School of the Arts is located on the original CSA site at 2064 Stearns Road in the Heart of University Circle. The grand opening ribbon cutting ceremony occurred on October 24, 2015.

Arts
Cleveland School of the Arts offers several different majors: Dance, Interdisciplinary Arts, Literary Arts, Music: Band, Orchestra, and Vocal, Theater, Visual Arts: Drawing and Photography. All students must audition to attend.

Academics
Cleveland School of the Arts artist scholars excel in academics: 99% graduation rate with 100% attending institutions of higher learning. Cleveland School of the Arts students have high attendance rates, OGT and OAT test scores.

Notable alumni
Jason Champion Men At Large  (1991)
Avant-R&B singer/songwriter (1995)
Stephanie Howse- Ohio State Representative 11th District (1997)
Conya Doss R&B singer/teacher

Notes and references

External links

School Website

Education in Cleveland
High schools in Cuyahoga County, Ohio
Schools of the performing arts in the United States
University Circle
Public high schools in Ohio
Public middle schools in Ohio
Magnet schools in Ohio
Educational institutions established in 1981
1981 establishments in Ohio
Cleveland Metropolitan School District